The Ango is a tributary of the Omolon in Russia's Magadan Oblast in northeast Siberia. It is Omolons right tributary and flows into it  from its mouth.
Its name comes from an Even word Anu, meaning willow.

See also
List of rivers of Russia

References

Rivers of Magadan Oblast